Jackie Lyne (1923 - 15 December 1993) was an Irish Gaelic football trainer, selector and player. His league and championship career at senior level with the Kerry county team spanned twelve seasons from 1943 to 1954.

Born in Killarney, County Kerry, Lyne was raised in a family that had a strong association with the game of Gaelic football. His brothers, Dinny and Mikey, both enjoyed All-Ireland success with Kerry. Lyne's nephew, Pat Spillane, was an eight-time All-Ireland medal winner with Kerry between 1975 and 1986.

Lyne played competitive Gaelic football during his schooling at St. Brendan's College. Here he claimed a Dunloe Cup medal before later winning county senior championship medals as a dual player. Lyne subsequently joined the Killarney Legion club and enjoyed an eighteen-year senior championship career, winning one county senior championship medal in 1946.

Lyne made his debut on the inter-county scene at the age of seventeen when he was selected for the Kerry minor team in 1941. He enjoyed one championship season with the minor team, however, he ended the year as All-Ireland runner-up. He made his senior debut in a tournament game in 1943. Over the course of the next twelve seasons, he won two All-Ireland medals in 1946 and 1953. He also won eight Munster medals. After being dropped from the Kerry team prior to the 1954 All-Ireland final, he played his last game for Kerry later that year in a tournament.

After being chosen on the Munster inter-provincial team for the first time in 1945, Lyne was an automatic choice on the starting fifteen for much of the next decade. During that time he won three Railway Cup medals.

In retirement from playing, Lyne continued his association with Kerry by becoming involved in team management and coaching. He was a selector with the Kerry senior team that claimed All-Ireland honours in 1955. Over a decade later Lyne returned to the senior team as trainer. In his four seasons in charge he guided the team to two successive All-Ireland Championships, three successive Munster Championships and two National Leagues.

Honours

Player
University College Cork
Sigerson Cup (1): 1944

Killarney Legion
Kerry Senior Football Championship (1): 1946

Kerry
All-Ireland Senior Football Championship (2): 1946, 1953
Munster Senior Football Championship (8): 1944, 1946, 1947, 1948, 1950, 1951, 1953, 1954
Munster Minor Football Championship (1): 1941

Munster
Railway Cup (3): 1946, 1948, 1949

Selector
Kerry
All-Ireland Senior Football Championship (1): 1955
Munster Senior Football Championship (1): 1955

Trainer
Kerry
All-Ireland Senior Football Championship (2): 1969, 1971
Munster Senior Football Championship (3): 1968, 1969, 1970
National Football League (2): 1968-69, 1970-71

References

1923 births
1993 deaths
Gaelic football coaches
Gaelic football selectors
Kerry inter-county Gaelic footballers
Killarney Legion Gaelic footballers
Munster inter-provincial Gaelic footballers
Jackie
Winners of two All-Ireland medals (Gaelic football)